Jethro Dionisio (born January 24, 1972 in Manila, National Capital Region) is a shooter from the Philippines. Nicknamed The Jet, he represented the country in the 2004 Summer Olympics. He is also a famous practical shooter, having won the country's nationals several times starting at the age of 16. At 18, he competed, and won the U.S. Steel Challenge World Speed Shooting Competition (1990). He would go on and win two more times, 1992-1993. He is only 1 of 5 people, male and female, to have won the competition more than 2 times.

References
 sports-reference

See also
Philippines at the 2004 Summer Olympics
Steel Challenge

1972 births
Filipino male sport shooters
Trap and double trap shooters
Olympic shooters of the Philippines
Shooters at the 2004 Summer Olympics
Living people
Sportspeople from Manila
Asian Games medalists in shooting
Shooters at the 2002 Asian Games
Shooters at the 2006 Asian Games
Shooters at the 2010 Asian Games
Asian Games bronze medalists for the Philippines
Southeast Asian Games silver medalists for the Philippines
Southeast Asian Games medalists in shooting
Medalists at the 2002 Asian Games
Competitors at the 2007 Southeast Asian Games